Perrinia konos is a species of sea snail, a marine gastropod mollusk in the family Chilodontaidae.

Distribution
This species occurs in the Indian Ocean off South Africa and Madagascar.

References

konos
Gastropods described in 1964